Herschend Family Entertainment (HFE) is a privately owned themed-entertainment company that operates several theme parks and tourist attractions within the United States, and as of 2021, one aquarium in Vancouver, Canada. 

Founded by Jack and Pete Herschend of Branson, Missouri, in its early years HFE was simply known as Herschend Enterprises. In the 1980s the name was changed to Silver Dollar City Inc., and in 2003, the company gained the current name. HFE is currently headquartered in Peachtree Corners, Georgia. The company says it's mission is to "Create Memories Worth Repeating” in a manner “consistent with Christian values and ethics.”

History
HFE traces roots back to Hugo and Mary Herschend from Chicago, Illinois along with sons Jack and Pete. The family vacationed in Missouri's Ozark Mountains region and fell in love with the nature the area offered. In 1951 Hugo obtained a 99-year lease on a Branson, Missouri area attraction called Marvel Cave. Hugo suffered a heart attack and later died in 1955, however Mary along with her two sons continued to improve the cave attraction by installing electric lighting and building cement walkways. A cable train was installed in 1958 to ferry guests out of the depths of the cave upon the end of the tour. The attendance nearly doubled and a small frontier town was erected to entertain visitors as they waited for their cave tour. In order to increase attendance furthermore at the attraction, a gimmick was used by naming the village "Silver Dollar City" and distributing silver dollars as change to every visitor in hope that when they would spend the rare coins they would tell people where they had got them from. The idea was a success, and the Herschend family soon found themselves involved in the theme park business.

In 1969, Silver Dollar City drew national attention when producer Paul Henning brought the cast and crew of the popular Beverly Hillbillies television show to the park to film five episodes.

In 2010, Herschend Family Entertainment was featured on the reality TV series Undercover Boss.

The company also co-owns and co-operates with partners Dolly Parton and her company The Dollywood Company, the dinner and theatre company Pirates Voyage Dinner and Show in Myrtle Beach, South Carolina and Dolly Parton's Stampede (formerly Dixie Stampede).

In April 2021, Hershend announced its purchase of the Vancouver Aquarium following the latter's severe economic losses during the COVID-19 pandemic.

Current properties

Amusement parks

Owned/operated

Water parks

Aquariums

Attractions

Dinner shows

Lodging

Sports Entertainment Franchise

The Dollywood Company
The Herschends extended their brand in 1976 upon purchasing a small tourist attraction in Pigeon Forge, Tennessee, called Goldrush Junction. The following year the attraction was renamed Silver Dollar City Tennessee as part of a development plan to transform the property into a theme park patterned after the original Silver Dollar City in Branson. For the Pigeon Forge park, the Ozark Mountains theme of the original Silver Dollar City was slightly reworked to represent the Great Smoky Mountains and Appalachia culture instead, fitting the location in the foothills of the Smokies.

In 1986, singer and actress Dolly Parton, who grew up near Pigeon Forge, became a co-owner, and the park's name was changed to Dollywood, reflecting her involvement. At this point, the Pigeon Forge park was branched off into a separate division of HFE called The Dollywood Company, which oversees all the properties that Dolly Parton has interest in.
 
Along with the Herschend family, Dolly Parton co-owns the Dolly Parton's Stampede (formerly Dixie Stampede) dinner attraction chain, which has locations in Pigeon Forge (opened 1988), Myrtle Beach (1992), and Branson (1995). A location in Orlando opened in 2003 and closed in early 2008.

In 2001 a new water park was opened adjacent to the Dollywood theme park called Dollywood's Splash Country.

Callaway Gardens

Former Herschend employee William R. "Bill" Doyle, III was hired as the President & CEO of Callaway Gardens in June, 2015. 

Doyle resigned effective July 8, 2019 after four years on the job to return to Herschend. He continued as a trustee of the Ida Cason Callaway Foundation and assisted in the search for a new president.

Herschend began managing Callaway Gardens in 2020. Two years later, they purchased most of the assets, including The Lodge & Spa, Golf: Lake View Course & Mountain View Course and conference center. Herschend will lease and manage the Ida Cason Callaway Foundation’s Virginia Hand Callaway Discovery Center, Cecil B. Day Butterfly Center, Ida Cason Memorial Chapel and the gardens. Callaway had about 500 employees.

Past properties
HFE built several water parks in the 1980s which have since sold to other companies such as Wet 'n Wild, Frontier City, and Six Flags. White Water Branson, built in 1980, was the forerunner and is still owned by HFE; while the White Waters in Oklahoma City (1981), Grand Prairie, Texas (1982), Garland, Texas (1982) and Atlanta (1983) have been sold.

The 4,000 seat Grand Palace Theatre opened in 1992 by the Herschends. The theatre was co-owned by singer Kenny Rogers. Along with Rogers headliners were Glen Campbell, Louise Mandrell and Barbara Mandrell. In 1994 HFE entered into a ten-year contract with Radio City Entertainment. The Grand Palace Theatre would be the first to host the Radio City Christmas Spectacular starring the world famous Rockettes outside of New York City’s Radio City Music Hall. The shows were successful and led to Radio City Entertainment launching tours of their shows in other cities throughout the United States.

HFE built the $10 million Grand Village Shops with Kenny Rogers adjacent to The Grand Palace Theatre in 1993. Ozark wares and English bone china filled the twenty six New Orleans themed shops. HFE later bought out entertainer Kenny Rogers and sold The Grand Palace in 1996 and The Grand Village in 2005.

American Adventures, a children's theme park opened alongside White Water Atlanta. The park was sold to Six Flags in 1999.

In 1994, The Dollywood Company constructed a large music theatre in Pigeon Forge called Music Mansion. Headlined by James Rogers, the highly successful theatre was operated by HFE until 2001, when it was sold to Anita Bryant. In 2005 the theatre was sold again and converted to a WonderWorks location. A Music Mansion Theatre was planned for Myrtle Beach, but never materialized.

In 2003 the Dollywood Company opened a new Dixie Stampede location in Orlando, Florida along Interstate 4. The location operated until early 2008, when the property was sold to Simon Property Group for an undisclosed amount. The building was torn down, and an extension of the Orlando Vineland Premium Outlets was built on the land. HFE has plans to build another Dixie Stampede in the region at some point, though specific plans have not been disclosed.

In 2004 HFE purchased the Hawaiian Falls water parks located in Dallas, Garland and The Colony, Texas. In 2006 all three parks were sold. 

In 2004 HFE purchased Ride the Ducks, In 2017 HFE Sold Ride the Ducks to Ripley Entertainment and shut the operations down in 2018 after the Deadly Sinking in Branson

Due to unreliable peak season water access, Ride The Ducks in Memphis closed in 2007, 2 Years Later: Ride The Ducks in Baltimore Shuts Down due to Safety Concerns 

Celebration City in Branson closed on October 25, 2008.

Herschend also briefly operated Six Flags Darien Lake from 2012-2014, installing the famous Moose on the Loose Pony Tack ride.

References

External links

 

 
Amusement park companies
Companies based in Atlanta
Stone Mountain